Evgeny Viktorovich Varlamov (born December 7, 1976) is a Russian former professional ice hockey defenceman.

Varlamov began his career in Estonia with Tallinna JSK and represented the country in junior level before making six senior international appearances for Russia. He played in the Russian Superleague and Kontinental Hockey League for Krylya Sovetov Moscow, Ak Bars Kazan, Metallurg Magnitogorsk and Torpedo Nizhny Novgorod.

References

External links

1976 births
Living people
Ak Bars Kazan players
Krylya Sovetov Moscow players
Metallurg Magnitogorsk players
Russian ice hockey defencemen
Torpedo Nizhny Novgorod players